The International ICT Council has been building up ICT certifications in the form of the International Information and Communication Technology Council Certification Program.  The program has been adopting an open process, in which volunteers of communities can participate.  It is believed that the adopted open process enhances both the quality and recognition of the certification program.



Certifications

Up to the date of updating this article, the certification program has the following series:

Information Security Officer
There are two certifications including the Information Security Penetration Testing Professional (ISP²) and the Computer Information Forensics Investigator (CIFI).

Intellectual and Digital Property Management
There is currently one examination — The Intellectual and Digital Property Management (MIP).

Linux Administrator
There are four levels of the certification.  Beginning from the foundation level to the advanced level, namely they are Linux Administration Associate (LAA), Linux Administration Professional (LAP), Linux Administration Expert (LAE), and Linux Administration Master (LAM).  For the Master level, there are several specializations including Higher Availability, Performance Tuning.

Linux System Programmer
There are two levels: Linux System Programmer Associate(LSPA)and the Linux System Programmer Professional (LSPP)

Embedded Linux Developer
As of now no certifications exist

Software Testing
There are three levels including Software Testing Associate (STA), Software Testing Professional (STP) and Software Testing Expert (STE)

Examination taking
The Council appoints authorized examination proctors.

References
Official website on certifications
Open Training Content Project (OTCP)
Government Technology Research Alliance (GTRA) Partners

Information technology qualifications